Ajax, dit is mijn club is a Dutch football news magazine revolving around AFC Ajax, a football club from Amsterdam and its supporters. The show airs Friday nights at 19:30 CET on TV channel AT5, weekly since 2012. During the show the creators Jasper van Schravend and Jelle de Gee interview the players and coaches about the coming or preceding matches, as well as air footage from the games and from the club's training grounds Sportpark De Toekomst, while summarizing the weekly news and events circulating around the club. The show also focuses on the club's supporters and culture around the club as well. The show airs weekly Fridays 19:30 CET, since the 2012-13 Eredivisie season.

See also
AFC Ajax
Ajaxjournaal
Television in the Netherlands

References

External links
 

AFC Ajax
Dutch sports television series
Dutch-language television shows